The 11th Annual TV Week Logie Awards were presented on Friday 21 March 1969 at Southern Cross Hotel in Melbourne and broadcast on the Nine Network. Bert Newton from the Nine Network was the Master of Ceremonies. American television actors Dennis Cole, Barbara Anderson, William Shatner, Ty Hardin, British actor Barry Morse and Skippy appeared as guests. This article lists the winners of Logie Awards (Australian television) for 1969.

Awards

Gold Logie
Most Popular Personality on Australian Television
Winner:
Graham Kennedy

Logie

National
Best Drama Show
Winner:
Homicide, Seven Network

Best Comedy Show
Winner:
I've Married a Bachelor, ABC

Best Teenage Personality
Winner:
Johnny Farnham

Best Overseas Show
Winner:
Rowan & Martin's Laugh-In

Best Commercial
Winner:
Cambridge Cigarettes

Best Documentary
Winner:
The Talgai Skull, ABC

Best Variety Show
Winner:
Sound of Music, Nine Network

Best Children's Show
Winner:
Adventure Island, ABC

Best Export Production
Winner:
Skippy The Bush Kangaroo, Nine Network

Victoria
Best Male Personality 
Winner:
Michael Preston

Best Female Personality 
Winner:
Rosemary Margan

Best Show
Winner:
In Melbourne Tonight, Nine Network

New South Wales
Best Male Personality 
Winner:
Don Lane

Best Female Personality 
Winner:
Penny Spence

Best Show
Winner:
Tonight with Don Lane, Nine Network

South Australia
Most Popular Male 
Winner:
Ernie Sigley

Best Female Personality 
Winner:
Anne Wills

Best Show
Winner:
Adelaide Tonight, Nine Network

Queensland
Best Male Personality
Dick McCann

Best Female Personality 
Winner:
Joy Chambers

Best Show
Winner:
I've Got a Secret, Nine Network

Tasmania
Best Male Personality 
Winner:
Lindsay Edwards

Best Female Personality 
Winner:
Caroline Schmit

Best Show
Winner:
Line-Up, ABC

Special Achievement Award
George Wallace Memorial Logie for Best New Talent
Winner:
Gerard Kennedy, Hunter

External links

Australian Television: 1966-1969 Logie Awards 
TV Week Logie Awards: 1969

1969 television awards
1969 in Australian television
1969